The Badlanders is a 1958 American western caper film directed by Delmer Daves and starring Alan Ladd and Ernest Borgnine. Based on the 1949 novel The Asphalt Jungle by W. R. Burnett, the story was given an 1898 setting by screenwriter Richard Collins. It is the second film adaptation of the novel following 1950's The Asphalt Jungle.

Plot
In 1898, two men are released from the Arizona Territorial Prison. One, mining engineer and geologist Peter Van Hoek, nicknamed the "Dutchman", tells the warden he was framed for the robbery of a gold shipment from the Lisbon Mine. The other, John McBain, killed Bascomb, the man who cheated him out of his land.

The two men head separately to the town of Prescott, where neither is welcome. The marshal, whom Van Hoek accuses of framing him, orders him to leave town on the next stagecoach, at sundown the next day. At the hotel, the Dutchman meets guest Ada Winton, the lonely mistress of Cyril Lounsberry.

McBain rescues a Mexican woman, Anita, when men accost her on the street. Though Leslie, the deputy, saves McBain's life in the ensuing fight, he gives McBain the same deadline to leave, even though McBain's folks settled the township. A grateful Anita invites McBain to stay in her place, and the two are attracted to each other. She admits having been a prostitute but McBain finally does not care.

The Dutchman gets Sample to introduce him to Lounsberry. Lounsberry had married Bascomb's homely sister for her money. Van Hoek offers to sell him gold ore from an extremely rich deposit that only he knows about. It is worth at least $200,000, but Van Hoek will be satisfied with half that amount in cash. He lies when Lounsberry jokingly asks if it is from his wife's Lisbon Mine. The prospect of being a rich man in his own right and leaving for Europe with Ada makes Lounsberry agree.

Van Hoek recruits a reluctant McBain and demolition expert Vincente for his scheme. They time it so the explosion needed to extract the ore goes off at the same time as the regular blasting. They get the ore out, but when Van Hoek and McBain take it to Lounsberry, he tries to double cross them. Leslie is killed and McBain wounded in the ensuing gunfight. Van Hoek takes McBain to Anita's place and digs out the bullet, then leaves in a wagon with the gold. However, Lounsberry, Sample and their men soon corner him in town during a fiesta. McBain goes to the Dutchman's aid. Then Anita has her many Mexican friends surround and disarm the villains. Van Hoek entrusts McBain and Anita with the gold, telling them he will meet them later in Durango to split it up equally. Then, keeping his word, he leaves on the stagecoach with fellow passenger Ada.

Cast
 Alan Ladd as Peter Van Hoek
 Ernest Borgnine as John McBain
 Katy Jurado as Anita
 Claire Kelly as Ada Winton
 Kent Smith as Cyril Lounsberry
 Nehemiah Persoff as Vincente
 Robert Emhardt as Sample
 Anthony Caruso as Comanche
 Adam Williams as Leslie
 Ford Rainey as Prison Warden
 John Daheim as Lee

Production
The movie was produced by Aaron Rosenberg, who had a deal to make films for MGM. Originally it was announced that the star would be William Holden. Then James Cagney and Paul Newman were going to play the leads. Eventually Alan Ladd signed to star; it was his first movie at MGM. Ernest Borgnine was his co-star.

Shooting took place at the MGM studio with three weeks location work in Kingman, Arizona. The movie was also shot at Old Tucson Studios.

Ernest Borgnine and Katy Jurado fell in love during the making of the film and were married.

Reception
According to MGM records, the film earned $970,000 in the US and Canada and $1,135,000 elsewhere resulting in a loss of $373,000.

References

External links
 
 
 
 
 Review of film at The New York Times

1950s heist films
1958 Western (genre) films
1958 films
American heist films
Films based on American novels
Films based on works by W. R. Burnett
Films directed by Delmer Daves
Films set in Arizona
Films shot in Tucson, Arizona
Metro-Goldwyn-Mayer films
CinemaScope films
Color film noir
1950s English-language films
1950s American films